The Winslow Formation was a geologic formation in Arkansas, now abandoned and replaced by the Atoka Formation, the Hartshorne Formation, and the lower McAlester Formation (previously Spadra Shale). It preserves fossils dating back to the Carboniferous period.

See also

 List of fossiliferous stratigraphic units in Arkansas
 Paleontology in Arkansas

References

 

Carboniferous Arkansas
Carboniferous southern paleotropical deposits